Harris is a surname predominantly originating in England and Wales.

Etymology 
Harris is a patronymic surname from the Middle English name Harry, a pet form of Henry.

In addition, the British surname can represent Old Norse Harri, Dutch Harries and Flemish Hariche. In Ireland, where the British name is well established, Harris can occur as a Anglicization of Ó hEarchadha.

Distribution

United Kingdom
For the latest available census data from 2011, the UK government did not generate a list of surname frequencies.

United States
For the latest available census data from 2010, Harris ranked as the 25th most common surname in the US with 624,252 entries. Harrison ranked as the 141st most common surname in the US with 181,091 entries.

See also
 Harries
 Harrison
 Harriss
 Herries
 List of people with surname Harris
 Búðardalur, a village 9km north of Harrastaðir, Iceland

References

Patronymic surnames
Surnames of British Isles origin